The Organist at St. Vitus' Cathedral is a 1929 silent Czech drama film directed by Martin Frič.

Production
The movie was shot at Kavalírka film studio. Exterior scenes were shot on location at Prague Castle. Frič was inspired by Billy Bitzer's The Love Flower. In the middle of filming a producer Vladimír Stránský went bankrupt and committed suicide.

Cast
 Karel Hašler as Organist
 Oscar Marion as Ivan, painter (as Oskar Marion)
 Suzanne Marwille as Klára, foster-child
 Ladislav H. Struna as Josef Falk, extortionist
 Otto Zahrádka as Klára's father
 Marie Ptáková as Abbess
 Vladimír Smíchovský as Innkeeper
 Josef Kobík as Fish vendor
 Milka Balek-Brodská as Maiden
 Roza Schlesingerová as Women in the Cathedral
 Václav Wasserman as New organist

References

External links
 

1929 films
1929 drama films
Czechoslovak black-and-white films
Czech silent films
Czechoslovak drama films
Films directed by Martin Frič
Silent drama films